Sam Franklin  is a retired American soccer player who spent his professional career in the USL A-League.

Youth
In 1994, Franklin graduated from Yorktown High School where he was 1994 All-Met soccer player.  He attended the University of Virginia, playing on the men's soccer team from 1994 to 1998.

Professional
On February 6, 1999, the Los Angeles Galaxy selected Franklin in the second round (twenty-fourth overall) of the 1999 MLS College Draft.  The Boston Bulldogs also selected Franklin in the USL A-League draft.  Franklin signed with the Bulldogs and spent two seasons in Boston.  In 2001, he played for the Connecticut Wolves.

References 

Living people
American soccer players
Boston Bulldogs (soccer) players
Connecticut Wolves players
Association football defenders
Virginia Cavaliers men's soccer players
A-League (1995–2004) players
Soccer players from Virginia
LA Galaxy draft picks
Year of birth missing (living people)
Yorktown High School (Virginia) alumni